The results of the 2013 Little League World Series were determined between August 15 and August 25, 2013 in South Williamsport, Pennsylvania. 16 teams were divided into two groups, one with eight teams from the United States and another with eight international teams, with both groups playing a modified double-elimination tournament. In each group, the last remaining undefeated team faced the last remaining team with one loss, with the winners of those games advancing to play for the Little League World Series championship.

Double-elimination stage

United States

Winner's bracket

Game 2: Washington 8, Texas 4

Game 4: Connecticut 3, Tennessee 2

Game 6: California 3, Michigan 0

Game 8: Delaware 6, Iowa 3

Game 14: Connecticut 9, Washington 7

Game 15: California 15, Delaware 3

Game 24: California 6, Connecticut 3

Loser's bracket

Game 10: Tennessee 10, Texas 2

Game 12:  Iowa 6, Michigan 5

Game 18: Tennessee 10, Delaware 0

Game 20: Washington 6, Iowa 5

Game 22: Washington 6, Tennessee 5

Game 26: Connecticut 14, Washington 13

International

Winner's bracket

Game 1: Panama 9, Puerto Rico 4

Game 3: Mexico 12, Australia 0

Game 5: Chinese Taipei 10, Canada 2

Game 7: Japan 7, Czech Republic 3

Game 13: Mexico 13, Panama 0

Game 16: Japan 3, Chinese Taipei 2

Game 23: Japan 5, Mexico 2

Loser's bracket

Game 9: Puerto Rico 4, Australia 0

Game 11: Canada 4, Czech Republic 3

Game 17: Chinese Taipei 6, Puerto Rico 4

Game 19: Panama 12, Canada 0

Game 21: Panama 8, Chinese Taipei 7

Game 25: Mexico 4, Panama 2

Crossover games

Game A: Texas 5, Australia 2

Game B: Czech Republic 5, Michigan 3

Single-elimination stage

International Championship: Japan 3, Mexico 2

United States Championship: California 12, Connecticut 1

Consolation Game

World Championship Game

References

External links
Full schedule from littleleague.org

2013 Little League World Series